Wonderworld is the seventh studio album by British rock band Uriah Heep, released in June 1974 by Bronze Records in the UK and Warner Bros. Records in the US. Wonderworld was the last Uriah Heep album to feature bass player Gary Thain.

The original vinyl release was a single sleeve, with the lyrics reproduced on the inner liner.

The album was remastered and reissued by Castle Communications in 1996 with four bonus tracks, and again in 2004 in an expanded deluxe edition.

Reception

AllMusic's retrospective review noted that "Wonderworld continues in the vein of Sweet Freedom, trying to bring Uriah Heep's appeal to a wider level while still retaining the grandiose trademark elements (the organ-guitar attack, David Byron's operatic shriek) that got them noticed". Comparing it to the band's prior work, reviewer Donald A. Guarisco added that "The result is an album that is solid but not as inspired as Look at Yourself or Demons and Wizards. The hard rock quotient is a little stronger on this album". Martin Popoff found Wonderworld "conceptually vacant" and "lacking the fluid instrumental chemistry that loosely held together its predecessor", while still containing two gems in the songs "Suicidal Man" and "So Tired".

Track listing

Personnel
Uriah Heep
David Byron – vocals
Mick Box – guitars
Ken Hensley – keyboards, guitars, backing vocals
Lee Kerslake – drums, percussion, backing vocals
Gary Thain – bass guitar

Additional musicians
Jose Gabriel – synthesizers
Michael Gibbs – orchestral arrangements on "The Easy Road"

Production
Gerry Bron – producer
Peter Gallen – recording engineer
Hans Menzel, Macki – Musicland engineers
Graham Hughes – photography and concept  
Harry Moss – cutting engineer

Charts

Album

Weekly charts

Year-end charts

Singles

Certifications

References

1974 albums
Uriah Heep (band) albums
Albums produced by Gerry Bron
Bronze Records albums
Warner Records albums